The men's 200 metre individual medley event at the 2018 Commonwealth Games was held on 10 April at the Gold Coast Aquatic Centre.

Records
Prior to this competition, the existing world, Commonwealth and Games records were as follows:

The following records were established during the competition:

Results

Heats
The heats were held at 11:13.

Final
The final was held at 20:15.

References

Men's 200 metre individual medley
Commonwealth Games